Ti amo... is a compilation album released in 2006 by the Italian singer Mina. The album contains previously released songs between 1994 and 2005.  The cover is inspired by the pop art artist Roy Lichtenstein.

Track listing

Charts

References

2006 compilation albums
Mina (Italian singer) compilation albums